Niels Viggo Bentzon (Copenhagen, 24 August 1919 – Copenhagen, 25 April 2000) was a Danish composer and pianist.

Biography 
Bentzon was the son of Viggo Bentzon (1861-1937), Rector of Copenhagen University and Karen Hartmann (1882-1977), concert pianist. Though his mother, Bentzon was descended from the Danish organist and composer Johan Ernst Hartmann and was the great-grandson of the Danish composer J.P.E. Hartmann. From 1938 to 1942, he studied at the Royal Danish Academy of Music in Copenhagen under Knud Jeppesen and Christian Christiansen. He then taught at The Royal Academy of Music in Aarhus (1945–50) and at The Royal Danish Academy (1950–88).

As a pianist, he left many recordings of works by Beethoven, Scriabin, Busoni, Schoenberg, Petrassi and others, though he is mainly known for the interpretation of his own works.

Bentzon had also a rare gift for improvisation and, when inspired, could improvise in a single evening a complete piano sonata as well as a suite, so perfect that they later could be written down by students and recorded (see the amazing suite in eight movements transcribed and recorded by Tonya Lemoh for the Classico label).

These qualities inscribe him in the great classical tradition of the composer/interpreter/improviser.

More anecdotally, he is also well known for the jingle D/S/B on the acronym of the Danish Railroad Company "Danske Statsbaner", his most performed piece as it is played on arrival of any train in Danish rail stations.

A colorful personality, and a cultural phenomenon, he became famous in Denmark for his frequent appearances in the media. His celebrity, rare for a classical musician, may have occasionally given him the reputation of an eccentric and have overshadowed the exceptional quality of his works.

A giant in his field, literally and figuratively, he often suffered from severe depressions and regularly had to be treated in psychiatric institutions.

His son, Nikolay Bentzon (born in 1964) is a reputed jazz and classical pianist.

Works 
Niels Vigggo Bentzon's compositions extend to 664 opus numbers, including 24 symphonies, operas, ballets, concertos for almost all instruments (of which 7 for the piano), and 16 string quartets. Arguably the most significant part of his œuvre is for the piano to which a third of his output is dedicated, and consisting of 31 numbered sonatas (and many unnumbered), partitas, suites, toccatas and others. Of particular importance are the 13 separate sets of 24 preludes and fugues, collectively known as "The Tempered Piano", which represents a rare 20th-century example of music written in all 24 major and minor keys.

Niels Viggo Bentzon's style can mostly be described as "neoclassical" and is influenced by composers such as Paul Hindemith, Johannes Brahms, Bela Bartok and Carl Nielsen. Later compositions draw also inspiration from Benjamin Britten, Alban Berg or Igor Stravinsky.

His works can often be volcanic and fiery, then alternating with more poetic parts, and have some stylistic affinity with Prokofievs piano sonatas. In the fifties Bentzon has used the metamorphosis technique and he has later also written dodecaphonic works but, whatever the technique used, his style is easily recognizable and characterized by great expressivity, strong contrasts and striking themes. The quality of his best works is high and they have become classics in the Danish repertoire. Bentzon had a leading role in the Scandinavian music of the second half of the 20th century.

As a pianist, Niels Viggo Bentzon was the first pianist to record Arnold Schoenberg's Suite for Piano, Op. 25. Bentzon also wrote novels, poetry as well as books on Beethoven, Hindemith or dodecaphonic music, and liked to draw and paint in his spare time.

Music
See List of compositions by Niels Viggo Bentzon

Bibliography 

 Bertel Krarup, Niels Viggo Bentzon, Danske Komponister, Multivers, 2020, 144 pages
 Toke Lund Christiansen, Bentzon, komponist, pianist, provokatør, Aarhus Universitetsforlag, 2019, 326 pages
 Niels Viggo Bentzon, Beethoven - en skitse af et geni, København, 1970
 Niels Viggo Bentzon, Focus paa en musikalsk fløderandssituation, København, 1999
 Niels Viggo Bentzon, Paul Hindemith, København 1997
 Niels Viggo Bentzon, Tolvtoneteknik, København, 1953
 Klaus Møllerhøj, Niels Viggo Bentzon kompositioner, København 1980

References 

1919 births
2000 deaths
Danish classical composers
Danish male classical composers
20th-century classical composers
Royal Danish Academy of Music alumni
Musicians from Copenhagen
People from Copenhagen
20th-century Danish male musicians
Hartmann family
Olufsen Records artists